Ivan Vitaliyevich Nifontov (born 5 June 1987, in Pavlodar) is a Russian judoka. He won the bronze at the 2012 Summer Olympics in the category men's –81 kg.  He carried the Winter Olympic torch before the Sochi Games.

References

External links

 
 
 
 

Living people
1987 births
Judoka at the 2012 Summer Olympics
Russian male judoka
Olympic judoka of Russia
Olympic medalists in judo
Olympic bronze medalists for Russia
Medalists at the 2012 Summer Olympics
Judoka at the 2015 European Games
European Games medalists in judo
European Games silver medalists for Russia
European Games bronze medalists for Russia